Lee Jae-kyoo (born October 7, 1970) is a South Korean television and film director. Lee directed the television series, Damo (2003), Fashion 70's (2005), Beethoven Virus (2008), The King 2 Hearts (2012) and All of Us Are Dead (2022), as well as the films The Influence (2010), The Fatal Encounter (2014) and  Intimate Strangers (2018).

Filmography

Television

As assistant director
See and See Again (MBC, 1998–1999)
Kuk-hee (MBC, 1999)
Ajumma (MBC, 2000–2001)

As director
Damo (MBC, 2003)
Fashion 70's (SBS, 2005)
Beethoven Virus (MBC, 2008)
The King 2 Hearts (MBC, 2012)
All of Us Are Dead (Netflix, 2022)

As producer
Trap (OCN, 2019)

Film

As director
The Night Before the Strike (1990)
The Influence (2010)
The Fatal Encounter (2014)
Intimate Strangers (2018)

Awards
2004 Baeksang Arts Awards: Best New Director (TV) (Damo)
2008 MBC Drama Awards: Special Award in TV, Director (Beethoven Virus)

References

Notes

Citations

External links
 
 
 

Living people
1970 births
South Korean television directors
South Korean film directors